Glider is a 4 piece jazz-rock combo created by Jim Bogios and David Immergluck - both members of Counting Crows.  The band also includes bass player Yoshi Sako (Beatropolis) and Danny Eisenberg (Acacia Collective, Ryan Adams Band) on the Hammond B3.  Glider was formed to allow Jim Bogios and David Immergluck to play music that they both enjoyed as children when they were not playing with Counting Crows, and was primarily modeled after Booker T and the M.G.'s and The Meters.  Bogios, Immergluck and Eisenberg have had numerous collaborations around the San Francisco Bay Area. The band has never released a studio recording, but a number of bootleg recordings and videos from live shows and a handful of studio recordings have been circulated among fans.  Between 2003 and 2009, Glider played shows in San Francisco, Oakland, Berkeley and Sacramento between Counting Crows tours.  Glider has been inactive since their last show on December 26, 2009, at Cafe Du Nord in San Francisco.

American post-rock groups
American jazz-rock groups